Dallas McIlwain (born 24 January 1982 ) is an Australian former professional rugby league footballer who played in the 2000s for Canterbury-Bankstown in the National Rugby League competition. McIlwain's position of choice was at lock-forward.

Background
McIlwain was born in Inverell, New South Wales, Australia.

Playing career
McIlwain made his first grade debut for Canterbury in 2005 and played 2 seasons with the club, however during the 2007 season McIlwain suffered a back injury. The injury would eventually force him to leave Canterbury and return to Queensland.  In 2008, McIlwain joined Wynnum-Manly in the QLD Cup competition.

References

External links
Official Dallas McIlwain NRL profile

1982 births
Living people
Australian rugby league players
Canterbury-Bankstown Bulldogs players
Rugby league centres
Rugby league locks
Rugby league players from Inverell, New South Wales
Rugby league second-rows